Dongguan TBA Tower is a skyscraper in Dongguan, China. The tower's architecture and engineering were performed by the French architect Hervé Tordjman and the architectural firm HTA-Architecture & Partners. It is named after the Taiwan Businessmen Association in Dongguan.

References

Buildings and structures in Dongguan
Skyscrapers in Guangdong
Skyscraper office buildings in China
Skyscraper hotels in China

Buildings and structures completed in 2013